Cryptopus, abbreviated Crypt. in the horticultural trade, is an orchid genus with 4 species native to Madagascar, Mauritius and La Réunion.

 Cryptopus brachiatus H.Perrier - Madagascar
 Cryptopus dissectus  (Bosser) Bosser - Madagascar, Mauritius, Réunion
 Cryptopus elatus  (Thouars) Lindl. - Mauritius, Réunion
 Cryptopus paniculatus H.Perrier - Madagascar

References

Vandeae genera
Angraecinae